Ernesta Robert-Mérignac (25 August 1849 – 18 February 1933) was a French sculptor. Her work was part of the sculpture event in the art competition at the 1924 Summer Olympics.

References

1849 births
1933 deaths
19th-century French sculptors
20th-century French sculptors
French women sculptors
Olympic competitors in art competitions
People from Saint-Omer
20th-century French women